Monroe Race Track was a 1/2 mile harness racing facility that opened in 1908 in Monroe, New York to a crowd of 2,200 people. The first president was Max O. Schaefer, general manager of the Monroe Cheese Company, and later president of the Velveeta Cheese Company. The track became a part of the Orange County Harness Racing Circuit which included Endicott, Middletown, Goshen, and Monroe until 1927, when Monroe was dropped by the circuit and was replaced by Elmira, New York which had just completed construction of a new 5,000 seat grandstand. In 1964 the grandstands were demolished and the track faded into history.

The track course remains in an undeveloped area of the village. It is a contributing property to the Village of Monroe Historic District, listed on the National Register of Historic Places in 1998.

References

External links
The Monroe Race Track

Monroe, New York
Defunct horse racing venues in New York (state)
Historic district contributing properties in New York (state)
1908 establishments in New York (state)
1964 disestablishments in New York (state)
Harness racing venues in the United States
National Register of Historic Places in Orange County, New York
Sports venues on the National Register of Historic Places in New York (state)
Sports venues in Monroe County, New York
Sports venues completed in 1908
Sports venues demolished in 1964